Olympique Saint-Quentinois (OSQ) is a French association football team founded in 1920. They are based in Saint-Quentin, Picardy, in northern France and are currently playing in the Championnat National 2 following promotion from Championnat National 3 in 2019. They play at the Stade Paul Debrésie in Saint-Quentin, which has a capacity of 10,000.

Current squad

References

External links
  

Football clubs in France
Association football clubs established in 1920
1920 establishments in France
Sport in Aisne
Football clubs in Hauts-de-France